Catherine Mavrikakis (born January 7, 1961) is a Canadian academic and award-winning writer living in Quebec.

The daughter of a Greek father who grew up in Algeria and a French mother, she was born in Chicago and grew up in Anjou, Montréal-Nord, St. Leonard, in France and in the United States. She settled in Montreal in 1979. From 1993 to 2003, she taught at Concordia University. In 2003, she joined the department of French language literature at the Université de Montréal.

The 2015 virtual reality work The Unknown Photographer incorporated text by Mavrikakis.

Selected works 
 Deuils cannibales et mélancoliques, novel (2000)
 Ça va aller, novel (2002)
 Fleurs de crachat, novel (2005), translated into English by Nathanaël as Flowers of Spit (2011) which was shortlisted for a ReLit Award
 Condamner à mort. Le meurtre et la loi à l'écran, essay (2005), received the Prix Victor-Barbeau and was shortlisted for a Governor General's Award for Literary Merit in 2006
 Omaha Beach, play (2008), shortlisted for a Governor General's Award for Literary Merit in 2008
 Les derniers jours de Smokey Nelson, novel (2011), shortlisted for the Governor General's Award for French-language fiction

References 

1961 births
Living people
Canadian novelists in French
Academic staff of Concordia University
Academic staff of the Université de Montréal
Canadian dramatists and playwrights in French
Writers from Montreal
American emigrants to Canada
Canadian women novelists
21st-century Canadian novelists
Canadian women dramatists and playwrights
Canadian people of Greek descent
21st-century Canadian dramatists and playwrights
21st-century Canadian women writers
21st-century Canadian essayists
Canadian women essayists